Companions of St George may refer to:

 Companions of the Brotherhood of Saint George, a military guild in Dublin (1474–94)
 Companions of the Guild of St George, a charitable education trust founded by John Ruskin in 1871
 Companions of the Order of St Michael and St George, members of the British order of chivalry with post-nominal CMG